Wife, Mom, Bounty Hunter is a reality TV show starring Sandra Scott balancing family life with running her own bail bonds business in Phoenix, Arizona, United States.

External links 
 
 TV.COM Profile

2007 American television series debuts
2000s American reality television series